Paradiso sul mare (Paradise on the sea), Anzio, Italy, is an Art nouveau palace designed by the italian architect, Cesare Bazzani.

History 
Completed in 1924, the five-story palace is located on the promenade of the Anzio shoreline. 

Paradiso sul mare is today owned by the municipality of Anzio.  The beautiful rooms of the Paradiso sul mare initially were destined to house the casino of the city, but the casino was never opened. 

Today the palace houses a hospitality school, event space, art exhibitions and movie sets.  The building has appeared in Alberto Sordi's 1973 Polvere di stelle (Stardust).  In Federico Fellini's Amarcord, where it is featured as the "Grand Hotel of Rimini" and even appears on the original poster of the film designed by John Alcorn.

Exhibitions 
 Controluce, Giuliano Giganti, Paradiso sul mare (2004)
 Teknemedia, archives, Bianca Madeccia, Rocco Paternostro, Luca Pietrosanti (2006)
 Il Litorale, incontro-spettacolo di arti visive, teatro, danza e musica, con circa trenta artisti delle varie discipline (2006)
 Anzio, Nettuno informa, Modellini militari (2007)
 Arte brasiliana al Paradiso sul mare, Dominique Le Comte, Joseph Pace, Carlos Araujo (2010)
 Trezeri Quarantadue, Un nuovo obiettivo per Anzio, Mostra fotografica, Paradiso sul mare (2010)
 Provincia di Roma, Marilda Dib (2010)
 Anzio Nettuno informa, Roger Waters of Pink Floyd receive the honorary citizenship of Anzio (2013)
 Sbarco di Anzio 70th Anniversary of the Landing of Anzio (2014)

External links 
 Photo Gallery, Paradiso sul mare, Anzio

See also
 Anzio
 Battle of Anzio

Palaces in Lazio